The 10th Grand National Assembly of Turkey existed from 2 May 1954 to 1 November 1957. 
There were 541 MPs in the parliament. While the Democrat Party (DP) won a vast majority. The opposition was represented by the Republican People's Party (CHP) with 30 seats, the  Republican Nation Party with 5 seats and 7 Independents. In 1955 a new party (Liberty Party) was also founded.

Main parliamentary milestones 
Some of the important events in the history of the parliament are the following:
14 May 1954 – Celal Bayar was elected as the President of Turkey for the second time
17 May 1954 – Adnan Menderes formed the 21st government of Turkey
30 May 1954 – Law 6429 Kırşehir Province was abolished (In the 1954 elections Kırşehir citizens had voted for CMP)
22 May 1955 – Polemics in the parliament between DP and CHP
12 September 1955 – Martial law as a result of 6-7 September demonstrations 
15 October 1955 – A group of MPs were expelled from DP because of their support to "right to prove" in media.
8 December – Adnan Menderes formed 22nd government of Turkey
29 December 1955 – Liberty Party was founded by ex DP MPs.
1 July 1957 – Law 7001: Kırşehir Province was reestablished 
 27 October 1957 – General Elections

References

1954 establishments in Turkey
1957 disestablishments in Turkey
Terms of the Grand National Assembly of Turkey
10th parliament of Turkey
Republican People's Party (Turkey)
Democrat Party (Turkey, 1946–1961)
Republican Nation Party
Liberty Party (Turkey)
Political history of Turkey